Abdulghani Cabinet was the cabinet of Yemen formed by Abdul Aziz Abdul Ghani from 6 October 1994 to 25 May 1997.

List of ministers

See also 

 Politics of Yemen

References 

Cabinets of Yemen
1994 establishments in Yemen
Abdulghani Cabinet